Harlington School is a mixed secondary school and sixth form located in the Harlington area of the London Borough of Hillingdon, England.

Ofsted 
On its most recent full school inspection in 2015, Ofsted rated the school as "Good": this was an improvement on the previous 2013 rating of "Requires Improvement".

References

Secondary schools in the London Borough of Hillingdon
Educational institutions established in 1973
1973 establishments in England
Foundation schools in the London Borough of Hillingdon